Dynaread Special Education Corporation is a provider of dyslexia remediation services specifically designed for older struggling readers (ages 7+).

Headquarters 

Dynaread is headquartered in Cranbrook, British Columbia, Canada. Founder/CEO is Hans J.A. Dekkers. Head of Science is Christopher Mark Wessinger PhD. David Munro MSped MEd RCC  is responsible for Learning Disabilities and Clinical Counselling.

Service Areas 

Dynaread offers both Screening/Testing, as well as Remediation. Her services are specifically designed for older struggling readers (ages 7+).

A mobile app, named Dyslexia Screening App, an online Dyslexia Test, and the online Learn-to-Read program Dynaread.

Online Learn to Read Remediation 

Dynaread's online (SaaS) Learn to Read Remediation program is offered to both schools and private users. The BC Principals' & Vice-Principals' Association published an article on Dynaread in her October 2013 issue.

Dynaread Program Development Criteria 

The development criteria for Dynaread were aimed to address issues considered specific to older struggling readers. In particular, reduced progress under conventional phonics-based remediation, learned helplessness, and waning intrinsic motivation. Dynaread attempts to address these issues through language-based remediation, which delivers reading experiences in reader texts at par with an older child's verbal vocabulary and language skills.

As schools intrinsically move beyond a focus on learning to read past the initial grades, Dynaread believes that remediation requires high levels of self-efficacy: allowing students to do most of the remediation on their own.

Core Remediation Methodology 

The Dynaread approach cashes in on the resident verbal language skills of the student: mapping orthography with the already present information in the child's verbal language realm. Dynaread sequentially builds a student lexical route vocabulary through extraction of each unique word from a series of lesson texts at par with the verbal language skills of these older children. Dynaread then use priming and memory-storage techniques from the field of cognitive neuroscience to accurately map the orthography of this word whilst coupling it with accurate pronunciation. In three short sessions, typically completed within two days, the student is subsequently presented the source text from which these words were extracted. Reading this text fluently, intrinsic motivation is recovered, whilst the lexical route storage is expanded with the necessary accurate context, semantics, and syntactical information.

The curriculum consists of 195 lessons, grouped in 45 groups covering non-fictional subjects. A typical child requires 18 months to complete the curriculum.

Scientific Background 
The core of Dynaread's remediation approach is based on the ramifications of the Dual Route Cascaded Model of Visual Word Recognition and Reading Aloud (Coltheart, Max; Rastle, Kathleen;Perry, Conrad; Langdon, Robyn; Ziegler, Johannes. Psychological Review, Vol 108(1), Jan 2001, 204–256.). The majority of children affected by Dyslexia share a phonological decoding deficit core. These scientific understandings form the foundation under the fundamental approach of Dynaread's present remediation method for older struggling readers impaired with substantial levels of phonological processing difficulties.

Dyslexia Advocacy 
Dynaread is a Corporate Member of the International Dyslexia Association.

Dynaread became the first corporate sponsor of the production Dislecksia: The Movie, produced by Harvey Hubble V. The movie received nationwide attention in the United States and seeks to play an important role in dyslexia advocacy. The New York Times covered Dislecksia: The Movie on October 3, 2013.

External links 
 International Dyslexia Association
 Definition of Dyslexia

References 

Dyslexia
Companies based in British Columbia
Cranbrook, British Columbia